Local elections were held in Moldova on April 16, 1995. A detailed report on elections is published by IFES (International Foundation for Electoral Systems).

The Agrarian Party of Moldova (PAM) won these elections.

References 

 

1995 in Moldova
Local elections in Moldova
1995 elections in Moldova